The Lipscomb Bisons women's basketball team is the women's basketball team that represents Lipscomb University in Nashville, Tennessee, United States. The school's team currently competes in the ASUN Conference.

History
In 2004, Lipscomb finished in a four way tie for the regular season crown with Georgia Southern, Belmont, and UCF. In the conference tournament, they beat UCF 64–62 to win their first ever Atlantic Sun Conference tournament championship. They lost 76–45 to Vanderbilt in the First Round of the NCAA Tournament that year.

Postseason results

NCAA Division I

NAIA Division I
The Bisons made the NAIA Division I women's basketball tournament eight times, with a combined record of 13–8.

References

External links